The 2012–13 season is Sun Pegasus FC's 5th season in football in Hong Kong First Division League. Sun Pegusus will seek to win the league, which they failed last year as Kitchee won. The club will also be competing in the Senior Challenge Shield and the FA Cup.

Key Events
 19 July 2012: Sun Pegasus FC announced first team squad through their official website.
 29 September 2012: Two Brazilian, defender Costa De Miranda Natanael and midfielder Thiago Constância, joined the club for an undisclosed fee and for free respectively. On the other hand, Chinese midfielder Xiao Yifeng was released.
 25 December 2012: Hong Kong defender Ng Wai Chiu leaves the club and joins China League One club Tianjin Songjiang.
 26 December 2012: Chinese-Hongkonger midfielder Bai He joins the club on loan from South China until the end of the season.
 31 December 2012: Four Brazilian players, including Sandro, Jone da Silva Pinto, Thiago Constância and Costa De Miranda Natanael, are released by the club.
 11 January 2013: Serbian and Brazilian defender Igor Miović and Paulo Cesar Fonseca Nunes joined the club from Serbian SuperLiga club FK Smederevo and Brazilian club Central SC for an undisclosed fee respectively.
 11 January 2013: Bosnian forward Vladimir Karalić joins the club from Premier League of Bosnia and Herzegovina club FK Rudar Prijedor for an undisclosed fee.
 23 January 2013: South Korean forward Kim Dong-Ryeol joins the club as a free transfer after a successful trial in Malaysia.
 23 January 2013: Brazilian defender Juninho leaves the club and joins Biu Chun Rangers after spending a half season at the club.
 24 January 2013: South Korean midfielder Lee Kwan-yoo joins the club as a free transfer.
 29 January 2013: Hong Kong goalkeeper Ho Kwok Cheun rejoins the club from Sunray Cave JC Sun Hei for an undisclosed fee.
 31 January 2013: Hong Kong goalkeeper Poon Kwong Tak joins the club as a free transfer. He will also be the assistant coach of the team.
 4 May 2013: The club secured a place for the next season's First Division as they defeated Biu Chun Rangers 8–2 in the final match.
 11 May 2013: The club failed to gain a place for the 2013 Hong Kong AFC Cup play-offs as they lost 0–1 to Kitchee in the FA Cup final.

Players

First team
As of 6 March 2013.

Transfers

In

Out

Stats

Squad Stats

Top scorers
As of 4 May 2013

Disciplinary record
As of 11 May 2013

Competitions

Overall

First Division League

Classification

Results summary

Results by round

Matches

Pre-season

Competitive

First Division League

Senior Challenge Shield

Quarter-finals

FA Cup

Quarter-finals

Semi-finals

Final

Notes

References

TSW Pegasus FC seasons
Sun

zh:太陽飛馬2012年至2013年賽季